Ratchawong Road (lit: dynasty road) is a road in Bangkok, Thailand. It is located in the area of Bangkok's Chinatown, or popularly known in Thai as Yaowarat.

History
The road was constructed by King Chulalongkorn (Rama V). It links Charoen Krung Road (New Road) at the connecting with Suea Pa Road runs passing Yaowarat Road at the point which officially known as Ratchawong Intersection. Then aims to Ratchawong Pier on the bank of Chao Phraya River, total length is about 700 m (229 ft). The pier was a main port for passengers and cargo ships sailing between Bangkok and other provinces. The building along the road were owned by foreign companies (Chinese, Indian, and European) who were running wholesale businesses. The area near Yaowarat Road were once situated shopping centres and restaurants with popular menu of boil rice, ice cream, people of nobel family loved to come for dinner. One of these restaurants was used as a planning facility for a group of naval officers involved in the 1932 revolution. 

Presently, the old shops of the glorious days can still be seen at the beginning phase of the road while the ending phase near the pier owned by companies and commercial banks. In 1944, the time before World War II would soon come to an end, this point used to be the first location of Bangkok Bank, founded and operated by Chin Sophonpanich.  It has become Bangkok Bank, Ratchawong Branch today. At that time, Ratchawong Road could be considered as the real commercial district of Bangkok. It was the location where many commercial banks are stood, and has expanded to the neighbouring such as Suea Pa, Suan Mali, or even distant places like Si Lom or Sathon since both Si Lom and Sathon are not as prosperous districts as in the present.

In addition, the end of the road is also the terminal of BMA's bus line 204 (Huai Kwang-Ratchawong Pier).

In early 2016, Ratchawong Road ranked as the best pedestrian street of Bangkok from Urban Design and Development Center (UddC) due to the two sides surrounded by shaded trees, full of lively stalls and active shophouses.

References 

Streets in Bangkok

Samphanthawong district
Road junctions in Bangkok
Neighbourhoods of Bangkok